The municipal museum of Saverne, a small town in the Bas-Rhin department of France, is the oldest museum in the historic Alsace region outside of Strasbourg and Colmar, having been founded in 1858. It is located in the former Rohan Castle since 1952.

The museum is divided into three sections. The archaeological department in the vaulted basement is dedicated to the Gallo-Roman and Imperial Roman past of the antique  and its surroundings.The art and history department on the second floor is dedicated to the history of the castle and of the town, to local and regional costumes and folk art, and to sculptures from churches and chapels of Saverne and its periphery.A third department is dedicated to the donation Louise Weiss. Apart from personal and historical documents, and furniture, the collections assembled and bequeathed by the author, journalist, feminist, and politician of Alsatian descent comprises works of folk art from Cambodia, China, Ethiopia, Morocco, Russia, Sudan, and several other countries across the globe, as well as decorative arts, drawings, paintings by Western European artists such as Daum, Raoul Dufy, Maurice de Vlaminck, and Kees van Dongen. The Louise Weiss section of the museum was created in 1983 and is presented in its current form since 1996.

Gallery

References

External links 

Official website

Museums in Bas-Rhin
1858 establishments in France
Museums established in 1858
Archaeological museums in France
Folk art museums and galleries
Ethnographic museums in France
History museums in France
Art museums and galleries in France
Local museums in France